Carol Mayo Jenkins (born November 24, 1938) is an American actress who is most famous for playing Elizabeth Sherwood, a liberal and stern but fair-minded English teacher at New York City's High School for the Performing Arts on the T.V. series Fame. She left the show at the end of its fifth season in 1986 but made a return for the series finale a year later.

She also appeared in the television shows Aaron's Way, Matlock, and Max Headroom.

, she teaches acting at the University of Tennessee, where she appears frequently on the Clarence Brown Theatre stage.

Work

Film

Television

Stage

References

External links
 
 

1938 births
Living people
American television actresses
20th-century American actresses
University of Tennessee faculty
People from Knoxville, Tennessee
Actresses from Tennessee
American women academics
21st-century American women